You're the One for Me can refer to:
"You're the One for Me", a 1981 single by D. Train
"You're the One for Me", a 2007 single by Brett Lee featuring Asha Bosle
"You're the One for Me", a song by Status Quo from the album In Search of the Fourth Chord